Sensurround is the brand name for a process developed by Cerwin-Vega in conjunction with Universal Studios to enhance the audio experience during film screenings, specifically for the 1974 film Earthquake. The process was intended for subsequent use and was adopted for four more films, Midway (1976), Rollercoaster (1977), the theatrical version of Saga of a Star World (1978), the Battlestar Galactica pilot, as well as the compilation film Mission Galactica: The Cylon Attack (1979). Sensurround worked by adding extended-range bass for sound effects. The low-frequency sounds were more felt than heard, providing a vivid complement to onscreen depictions of earth tremors, bomber formations, and amusement park rides. The overall trend toward "multiplex" cinema structures presented challenges that made Sensurround impractical as a permanent feature of cinema.

Sensurround helped bring wider recognition to established loudspeaker manufacturer Cerwin-Vega, and aided in establishing a strong reputation for new audio amplifier company BGW Systems. The increased awareness of extended low-frequency sound reproduction that Sensurround brought to film audiences was a factor in the increase in subwoofer sales and in the rise in the number of subwoofer designs in the late 1970s and 1980s.

Development

Original design
Sensurround involved the installation of large, low frequency, horn-loaded speakers which contained specially designed 18-inch Cerwin-Vega Model 189 ES drivers in custom black wood cabinets. Three horn configurations were available, Model-C (Corner), Model-W (Folded Bass Bin) and Model-M (Modular). The Model-C and -M horns required stacking in groups of four, increasing effective horn mouth size to achieve the low frequency target. They came with special extenders used to widen the mouths of the horns and take advantage of the theater walls to further increase low frequency extension. The Model-M horn had a dedicated "Mouth-Extender" available when it was used in the front of the theater. While installation was customized and varied in each theater, the Sensurround horns were typically placed beneath the screen in front and in the back corners of the theater. Often, rows or sections of seats would have to be removed to make room for the large Sensurround horns. In large theaters, up to 20 individual horns might be used along with custom-built bat wings and mouth extenders.

The original Sensurround design used for Earthquake employed a pseudorandom noise generator, designed by D. Broadus "Don" Keele, Jr., to create the low-frequency rumble, using recordings of the 1971 Sylmar earthquake as a reference. Two low frequency control tones were printed on the film's mono optical or magnetic track; from the projector, the tones entered a control box in the projection booth, which fed low frequency pseudorandom noise to 1,600 watt BGW 750 audio amplifiers driving the speakers. The control box generated a pseudorandom noise signal with energy between 17 and 120 Hz. The control track method was employed because there was no way to accurately record bass lower than 40 Hz on an optical or magnetic film soundtrack at the time. When receiving the noise signal, the amplifier and subwoofers responded with sound pressures ranging from 100 dB to 120 dB. The resulting rumble could be felt by audience members as well as heard.

For the film Earthquake, Sensurround was activated during the quake scenes to augment the conventional soundtrack. In addition, portions of the main soundtrack were redirected to the Sensurround horns to create a partial surround sound effect. The control tones recorded on the film's optical or magnetic track triggered the rumble or surround sound effects as well as controlling their volume and the overall blend of the main soundtrack and low frequency noise effects. Two tones of 25 Hz and 35 Hz were used: these two tones allowed different effects to be activated when desired: the rumble could be turned on or off in the Sensurround horns, the main soundtrack could be sent to the Sensurround horns, the level of both the rumble and the soundtrack coming from the horns could be varied by varying the level of the control tones and the theater's main audio system could be increased in level by up to 8 dB at select points to create a greater dynamic range (MCA called this the "Step-Gain" function.)

For the original version of Sensurround, prints were available in the following formats:

35mm 4-Track Magnetic with Optical Track (magoptical): This type of Sensurround print was not usable as a mono optical print. Unlike standard magoptical prints, in which the optical track was a mono version of the magnetic stereo tracks, the optical track on magnetic Sensurround prints contained only the control tones. If played as a standard optical print, only the 25 Hz and 35 Hz control tones would be heard.  To control the Sensurround System and its volume levels, control tones recorded on the optical track varied from −14 to −6 dB below 100% modulation and activation of the Sensurround System occurred at −16 dB. For program sounds applied to the Sensurround Horns, Track-2 (Center Front) was used, with its level and timing controlled by the 25 Hz control tone. For magnetic playback in mono, Track-2 (Center Front) could be used because Earthquake was mixed with mono dialogue, unlike most stereo films up to that time. For 4-Track equipped theaters that wanted to run Earthquake without Sensurround, the standard 12 kHz CinemaScope switching signal was recorded on Track-4 (surround).  Because no noise reduction system was used on magnetic prints at the time, and due to the lower technical performance of the surround channels magnetic track, this switching system was implemented by 20th Century Fox during CinemaScope's development to reduce the hiss and system noise heard from the surround speakers. For Earthquake run in the United States, the surround speakers were disconnected and the Sensurround system was relied upon to produce all the surround sound effects; Track-4 was not used nor even connected to the Sensurround Integrator.  In Europe, the surround track was used in the normal manner, being controlled by the Sensurround Integrator like the other magnetic channels.
35mm Mono Optical: These were dual-purpose prints and could be used either with or without Sensurround. The optical track was a composite mix of the program and the control tones and were compatible with any optical playback system.  All mono mixes of the Earthquake soundtrack contain the control tones. To control the Sensurround System and its volume levels, control tones recorded on the optical track varied from −28 dB to −20 dB below 100% modulation.  Activation of the Sensurround System occurred at −30 dB. For program sounds applied to the Sensurround Horns, the composite mono soundtrack was used, with its volume and timing regulated by the 25 Hz control tone.
70mm 6-Track Magnetic Stereo: The Sensurround Control Tones were recorded on Tracks 2 and 4 and are 100 Hz instead of 25 Hz and 35 Hz. This was because the magnetic system could not reproduce the very low-frequency control tones reliably.  The 100 Hz tone on Track-2 controls the program effects applied to the Sensurround Horns and the 100 Hz tone on Track-4 controls the rumble effect applied to the Sensurround horns.  Like the other systems, the level of the 100 Hz tones varies the levels applied to the Sensurround horns and when both control tones are present, the Step/Hi-Gain function is turned on to increase the dynamic range of the main program by 8 dB. Track-3 (Center Front) is applied to the Sensurround system for program sounds.  No other signal is recorded on Tracks 2 and 4.  70mm Sensurround prints were issued only outside of the US.  In addition, Earthquake was the only Sensurround film recorded in stereo or issued with 70mm prints.  All other Sensurround films were 35mm mono optical in the Sensurround Mod-II or Mod-III format.

Sensurround Mod-II
Even before Earthquake ended its theatrical run, MCA began a program to re-engineer the Sensurround system to enable the recording of the deep bass on a standard 35mm optical soundtrack, with no external rumble generator being required, as well as improve fidelity and the overall effect and to simplify the system. In addition, dbx Type-II noise reduction was incorporated to increase the dynamic range and reduce audible noise created by the optical process. MCA also changed the way the control tones were used, allowing the Sensurround horns in the front and back of the theater to be controlled independently. This allowed for more creative effects, such as a sound being panned from front to back of the theater. Re-engineering the system was important to MCA because there were times during dialogue sequences when the sound mixers wanted the Sensurround running but did not want the dialogue to shift to the back of the theater.  Having separate control of the front and back groups of Sensurround horns allowed this. The drivers in the Sensurround horns were improved to extend their frequency response higher so they could reproduce the low notes in music, thus allowing sound mixers to incorporate music into the Sensurround system (this was used to good effect in Rollercoaster.) Advancements by RCA in optical soundtrack recording led MCA engineers to the realization that an optical track could reliably record and reproduce bass down to 10 Hz. As well, removal of the Academy equalization would allow the high frequency response to be extended upward by an additional octave. The addition of dbx Type-II noise reduction and its attendant increase in useful dynamic range created a high-fidelity sound from a conventional optical print. MCA called this re-engineering of the system "Sensurround Mod-II" and the market name of the system was changed from just "Sensurround" to the "Sensurround Special Effects System".

Unlike the original version of Sensurround, Mod-II (and later, Mod-III) were only for use with mono optical soundtracks. Due to the use of dbx Type-II noise reduction, MCA eliminated the standard Academy Filter traditionally used on optical prints, thus giving Sensurround an increased frequency response of 16 Hz to 16 kHz and a dynamic range of 86 dB, superior to 70mm magnetic prints of the time. It also allowed a mono optical track to have surround sound effects and MCA began to market the system to other studios and producers as a truly high-fidelity sound and special effects system. Dolby Stereo optical was just beginning to become known in the industry and MCA felt they had a viable competing format.  While Warner Bros. and Paramount seriously considered adopting the system, in the end only Universal Studios ever released films using the process. Both Warner and Paramount later patented their own "special effects" systems to create Sensurround-type effects.

Sensurround Mod-III

Mod-III Sensurround was a further refinement of the system to allow more control over level, timbre and placement of effects. Instead of a simple wide-range rumble that could be felt and heard, Mod-III used more narrow band extended low frequency effects in the 16–25 Hz range, in addition to the higher frequency program sounds and surround-sound effect. Thus, scenes could have dialogue and other audio at standard levels, plus the effect of movement from the infrasonic rumble, creating sensations that had not been possible in earlier Sensurround films. Mod-III Sensurround was used in Battlestar Galactica in 1978.

Sensurround was a highly successful theatrical sound system. By 1976, when Midway opened, there were over 800 theaters with Sensurround capability in the US. Worldwide, there were over 2000 Sensurround theaters. During the initial design of the system MCA figured it would be installed in a limited number of theaters across the US—perhaps 30 in all—and that smaller theaters, or theaters in small towns, would not want to bother with the installation or the loss of seating capacity necessitated by the large Sensurround horns. This was quickly disproved: Earthquake premiered with 17 Sensurround installations and by the end of its run over 400 theaters had shown the film in Sensurround. Midway opened with 300 Sensurround-equipped theaters. At first, MCA only rented Sensurround to theaters at a cost of $500 per week, but by the opening of Midway, theaters could purchase the systems outright and MCA had begun to ship the Model-M horns to theaters un-assembled. Theater owners also had the option of purchasing only the Cerwin-Vega drivers and horn cabinet blueprints, buying the wood and making the horn cabinets themselves. MCA made these changes due to the success of the system and because the shipping costs of the heavy Sensurround horns were becoming very expensive.

Throughout the history of the Sensurround program, RCA Technical Services performed the theater installations and maintenance. If repairs or replacements were required, the RCA technicians contacted MCA Systems to order needed parts. Because control tones were used to trigger the Sensurround horns, theaters could not generally use the system with their standard films unless a rewiring was done.

History

Awards
In 1974, Waldon O. Watson, Richard J. Stumpf, Robert J. Leonard and the Universal City Studios Sound Department received a special Scientific and Engineering Academy Award for "the development and engineering of the Sensurround System for motion picture presentation". The film Earthquake also won an Academy Award for Best Sound (Ronald Pierce, Melvin M. Metcalfe Sr.).

In 1976, MCA was granted  for the Sensurround system.

Drawbacks
Sensurround speakers involved expense for theater owners. Rental for speakers cost $500 a month in 1974 and their installation involved the removal of some seats. The extra expense was commercially justifiable as long as it appeared to provide an advantage in drawing audiences.

Sensurround made Earthquake a popular "event" film in 1974 and one of the year's highest-grossing films. Sensurround presented practical challenges, though, in multiplex cinemas where separate theater spaces shared walls. Audiences for The Godfather Part II, which opened the same month (November 1974) as Earthquake, often complained to theater managers about the Sensurround effect when Earthquake was shown in an adjoining theater. The low-frequency vibrations rattled tiles and plaster, too, leading to damage in some venues; a safety net was installed at Mann's Chinese Theatre in Hollywood to catch errant pieces of plaster falling from the ceiling. When Earthquake was screened in Chicago, the head of the Chicago Building and Safety Department demanded that the system be turned down or removed to prevent damage to city theaters. In Germany, Sensurround movies could only be screened in single-screen houses. Subsequent Sensurround films, such as Midway, also tended to play in single-screen cinemas.

The success of Star Wars over Rollercoaster in the middle of 1977 demonstrated to theater operators the limits of Sensurround as a guarantor of audience draw. Battlestar Galactica: Saga of a Star World (1978) and Mission Galactica: The Cylon Attack (1979) marked the final bows of Sensurround, though Alien, a 20th Century Fox film, would see a limited release in 70mm Sensurround.

Competing processes

Cultural references
On their 1977 album Never Mind The Bollocks Here's The Sex Pistols, the punk rock group the Sex Pistols referenced Sensurround in their song "Holidays in the Sun" in the opening of the second verse ("It's in Sensurround sound in a two inch wall, I was waiting for the communist call").

The English gothic rock band The Sisters of Mercy reference Sensurround in the song "Body Electric" from their 1984 EP Body and Soul. ("Through the cables and the underground now
The faceless breathless calls, This is Babel, Sensurround now, This place is death with walls").

The alternative pop/rock band They Might Be Giants released a song titled "Sensurround" that was incorporated in the soundtrack to Mighty Morphin Power Rangers: The Movie and (in a different, faster-paced recording) their EP S-E-X-X-Y.  The song makes several references to the innovation, especially as used in Earthquake.

An early FoxTrot comic has Jason presenting his dinosaur movie in Sensurround.

In the 1993 film Matinee, Mant!, Matinee's film-within-a-film, was filmed in "Rumble-Rama", a not-so-subtle nod to Sensurround.

The alternative rock band Manic Street Preachers references Sensurround in the chorus of the song "Small Black Flowers That Grow In The Sky" ("Want to get out, won't miss you Sensurround") from the 1996 album Everything Must Go.

The Sensurround process is parodied in the 1979 film Kentucky Fried Movie in a sketch in which the fictional film See You Next Wednesday is screened in "Feel-Around", whereby a uniformed usher touches the viewer in time with the action on the screen, including assaulting and kissing them.

In its 1981 anti-materialism song "Elevator Muzik", the Resurrection Band references the process in the lyric "Elevating sales at the speed of sound, soon you'll be shopping in Sensurround".

Superman IV included a reference to a "Sensurround 100" early in the plot when Lex Luther is escaping prison guards.

See also
 5.1 surround sound

References

External links
 In70mm.com's Sensurround Page
 Introduction to Sensurround, reproduced from the Sensurround Model II manual at in70mm.com

Film and video technology
Surround sound
Loudspeaker technology
Universal Pictures